The Ulster Reform Club is a business, social and dining club in Northern Ireland.

The club's clubhouse, which opened on New Year's Day 1885, occupies a conspicuous position on Royal Avenue in the centre of Belfast.

Facilities

Members' bar
Dining room
Private dining rooms
Business room
Snooker room
Fitness suite
Reading room

Honorary Members
Marquess of Hartington 1885
Joseph Chamberlain 1887
Sir Henry James, Q.C. 1891
The 1st Marquess of Dufferin and Ava 1896
James Johnston 1904
Sir Edward Carson, K.C. 1921
The 1st Viscount Craigavon 1928 
The 7th Marquess of Londonderry 1930
Lt. Col. F.H. Crawford, C.B.E., J.P. 1941
J. M. Andrews, D.L. 1943
The 3rd Duke of Abercorn 1946
Sir Basil Brooke, 5th Bt., C.B.E., M.C. 1950
Sir Cecil McKee 1984

External links
 The Ulster Reform Club

Larmour, P. 1987. Belfast An Illustrated Architectural Guide.  Friar's Bush Press. 

1885 establishments in Ireland
Gentlemen's clubs in Northern Ireland